Emanuel Tutuc is an American physicist and professor at University of Texas at Austin and an Elected Fellow of the American Physical Society.

References

Year of birth missing (living people)
Living people
Fellows of the American Physical Society
University of Texas at Austin faculty
21st-century American physicists
Princeton University alumni